Cephonodes is a genus of moths in the family Sphingidae. (Cephanodes is a frequent misspelling.) The genus was erected by Jacob Hübner in 1819.

Species
Cephonodes apus (Boisduval, 1833)
Cephonodes armatus Rothschild & Jordan, 1903
Cephonodes banksi Clark 1923
Cephonodes hylas (Linnaeus, 1771)
Cephonodes janus Miskin, 1891
Cephonodes kingii (W. S. Macleay, 1826)
Cephonodes leucogaster Rothschild & Jordan, 1903
Cephonodes lifuensis Rothschild, 1894
Cephonodes novebudensis Clark, 1927
Cephonodes picus (Cramer, 1777)
Cephonodes rothschildi Rebel, 1907
Cephonodes rufescens Griveaud, 1960
Cephonodes santome Pierre, 2002
Cephonodes tamsi Griveaud, 1960
Cephonodes titan Rothschild, 1899
Cephonodes trochilus (Guerin-Meneville, 1843)
Cephonodes woodfordii Butler, 1889
Cephonodes xanthus Rothschild & Jordan, 1903

Gallery

References

 
Dilophonotini
Moth genera
Taxa named by Jacob Hübner